Püncogling is a village and township in Lhatse County, in the Shigatse Prefecture of Tibet Autonomous Region.

Location 

Püncogling Township has jurisdiction over the following seven villages; Püncogling, ​Pusong, Zijiang, Xiequ, Chada, Sadro and Naga.

See also
List of towns and villages in Tibet

References 

Populated places in Shigatse
Township-level divisions of Tibet